Epidermal growth factor (EGF) is a protein that stimulates cell growth and differentiation by binding to its receptor, EGFR. Human EGF is 6-kDa and has 53 amino acid residues and three intramolecular disulfide bonds.

EGF was originally described as a secreted peptide found in the submaxillary glands of mice and in human urine. EGF has since been found in many human tissues, including platelets, submandibular gland (submaxillary gland), and parotid gland. Initially, human EGF was known as urogastrone.

Structure 
In humans, EGF has 53 amino acids (sequence NSDSECPLSHDGYCLHDGVCMYIEALDKYACNCVVGYIGERCQYRDLKWWELR), with a molecular mass of around 6 kDa. It contains three disulfide bridges (Cys6-Cys20, Cys14-Cys31, Cys33-Cys42).

Function 
EGF, via binding to its cognate receptor, results in cellular proliferation, differentiation, and survival.

Salivary EGF, which seems to be regulated by dietary inorganic iodine, also plays an important physiological role in the maintenance of oro-esophageal and gastric tissue integrity. The biological effects of salivary EGF include healing of oral and gastroesophageal ulcers, inhibition of gastric acid secretion, stimulation of DNA synthesis as well as mucosal protection from intraluminal injurious factors such as gastric acid, bile acids, pepsin, and trypsin and to physical, chemical and bacterial agents.

Biological sources 
Epidermal growth factor can be found in platelets, urine, saliva, milk, tears, and blood plasma. It can also be found in the submandibular glands, and the parotid gland. The production of EGF has been found to be stimulated by testosterone.

Polypeptide growth factors 

Polypeptide growth factors include:

Mechanism 

EGF acts by binding with high affinity to epidermal growth factor receptor (EGFR) on the cell surface. This stimulates ligand-induced dimerization, activating the intrinsic protein-tyrosine kinase activity of the receptor (see the second diagram). The tyrosine kinase activity, in turn, initiates a signal transduction cascade that results in a variety of biochemical changes within the cell – a rise in intracellular calcium levels, increased glycolysis and protein synthesis, and increases in the expression of certain genes including the gene for EGFR – that ultimately lead to DNA synthesis and cell proliferation.

EGF-family / EGF-like domain 

EGF is the founding member of the EGF-family of proteins. Members of this protein family have highly similar structural and functional characteristics. Besides EGF itself other family members include:
Heparin-binding EGF-like growth factor (HB-EGF)
transforming growth factor-α (TGF-α)
Amphiregulin (AR)
Epiregulin (EPR)
Epigen
Betacellulin (BTC)
neuregulin-1 (NRG1)
neuregulin-2 (NRG2)
neuregulin-3 (NRG3)
neuregulin-4 (NRG4).

All family members contain one or more repeats of the conserved amino acid sequence:

CX7CX4-5CX10-13CXCX8GXRC

Where C is cysteine, G is glycine, R is arginine, and X represents any amino acid.

This sequence contains six cysteine residues that form three intramolecular disulfide bonds. Disulfide bond formation generates three structural loops that are essential for high-affinity binding between members of the EGF-family and their cell-surface receptors.

Interactions 

Epidermal growth factor has been shown to interact with epidermal growth factor receptor.

Medical uses
Recombinant human epidermal growth factor, sold under the brand name Heberprot-P, is used to treat diabetic foot ulcers. It can be given by injection into the wound site, or may be used topically. Tentative evidence shows improved wound healing. Safety has been poorly studied.

EGF is used to modify synthetic scaffolds for manufacturing of bioengineered grafts by emulsion electrospinning or surface modification methods.

Bone regeneration 
EGF plays an enhancer role on osteogenic differentiation of dental pulp stem cells (DPSCs) because it is capable of increasing extracellular matrix mineralization. A low concentration of EGF (10 ng/ml) is sufficient to induce morphological and phenotypic changes. These data suggests that DPSCs in combination with EGF could be an effective stem cell-based therapy to bone tissue engineering applications in periodontics and oral implantology.

History 
EGF was the second growth factor to be identified. Initially, human EGF was known as urogastrone. Stanly Cohen discovered EGF while working with Rita Levi-Montalcini at the Washington University in St. Louis during experiments researching nerve growth factor. For these discoveries Levi-Montalcini and Cohen were awarded the 1986 Nobel Prize in Physiology or Medicine.

References

Further reading

External links 

 Shaanxi Zhongbang Pharma-Tech Co., Ltd.-Supply of Epidermal Growth Factor
 EGF at the Human Protein Reference Database .
 
 EGF model in BioModels database

Growth factors
Morphogens